Espers was an American psychedelic folk band from Philadelphia, United States, that was part of the emerging indie folk scene. They formed in 2002 as a trio of singer-songwriter Greg Weeks, Meg Baird and Brooke Sietinsons but later expanded to a sextet including Otto Hauser, Helena Espvall and Chris Smith.  Their music is reminiscent of late-sixties British folk as well as many contemporary folk acts.  Most of the band's members have also featured on recordings by a number of other folk artists such as Nick Castro and Vashti Bunyan and as a result have become an important part of the psychedelic folk revival.

They released their self-titled debut in 2004 on Time-Lag Records and followed that with an album of cover songs, The Weed Tree, in 2005.  This release featured the band's versions of songs by artists as diverse as Nico, The Durutti Column and Blue Öyster Cult.  In 2006 the band released their third full-length album, II (presumably so called because it was their second album of original material), on Drag City Records.  Their fourth album, III, was released on October 20, 2009.

Discography

Albums
Espers (2004)
The Weed Tree (2005)
II (2006)
III (2009)

Singles
"Riding" / "Under The Waterfall" (7") (2005)

Compilation appearances
The Golden Apples of the Sun (compiled by Devendra Banhart for Arthur Magazine) (2004)
"Byss & Abyss"
Million Tongues Festival (compiled by Plastic Crimewave of Plastic Crimewave Sound for Arthur Magazine) (2004)
"Under The Waterfall"
The 2005 Believer CD (2005) (from The Believer magazine)
"Firefly Refrain" (originally by Fursaxa)
The R.E.M. Collection Disc 3 (2005) (compiled by Peter Buck) (from Uncut magazine's August 2005 issue)
"Meadow"
Rough Trade Shops - Counter Culture 2005 (2006)
"Meadow"
Folk Off (compiled by Rob Da Bank; Sunday's Best Records) (2006)
"Rosemary Lane"
Strange Folk (Albion Records) (2006)
"Flowery Noontide"
The Playlist August 2006 (2006) (from Uncut magazine's August 2006 issue)
"Mansfield and Cyclops"
Acoustic 07 (2007)
"Mansfield and Cyclops"
A Monstrous Psychedelic Bubble Exploding In Your Mind: Volume 1 (Compiled by Amorphous Androgynous) (2008)
"Mansfield and Cyclops"
The Quiet Revolution (2006) (from Mojo magazine's October 2006 issue)
"Children of Stone"
The Best Of 2006 (2006) (from Uncut magazine's December 2006 issue)
"Moon Occults The Sun"
Intersteller Overdrive (2008) (from Uncut magazine's October 2008 issue)
"Widow's Weeds"

References

External links
Espers at Drag City
Interview with Greg Weeks and Chris Smith, May 2008
Interview with Greg Weeks (2006)

Psychedelic folk groups
Musical groups from Philadelphia
American folk musical groups
Drag City (record label) artists
Wichita Recordings artists
Musical groups established in 2002
2002 establishments in Pennsylvania
Love Da Records artists
Locust Music artists